Phan Thanh Giản (November 11, 1796– August 4, 1867) was a Grand Counsellor at the Nguyễn court in Vietnam.  He led an embassy to France in 1863, and committed suicide when France completed the invasion of Southern Vietnam (Cochinchina) in 1867.

Phan Thanh Giản's grandfather was a Minh Hương (Ming dynasty refugees, with ancestry from Haicheng. Southern Fujian Province in China), while his grandmother was a Vietnamese woman.

Life

Treaty of Saigon 
Phan Thanh Giản was one of the foremost mandarins of the Nguyễn court.  He played a key role in negotiating the Treaty of Saigon with the French in 1862. The negotiations led to the formal cession of Vietnamese territory that the French Expeditionary Corps had occupied in 1861 (the first parts of the future colony of Cochinchina): the provinces of Già Dinh, Mỹ Tho, Biên Hòa, and the Poulo Condore islands were ceded, and war reparations paid to the French.

Because of his role in these negotiations, Phan Thanh Giản became rather unpopular, both with the Vietnamese population, and with the court of king Tự Đức.

Embassy to France (1863)
In 1863, Phan Thanh Giản was sent by the emperor on an embassy to France to visit Napoleon III, in order to negotiate the return of the territories given to the French. Phan Thanh Giản was accompanied by Michel Duc Chaigneau (the son of Jean-Baptiste Chaigneau) on this embassy. Phan Thanh Giản with a 70-strong embassy met with Napoleon III and Empress Eugénie in November 1863. Napoleon III, moved by Phan Thanh Giản's plea, accepted to return the provinces in exchange for a war indemnity, an agreement to station troops in Saigon, My Thau and Thủ Dầu Một, and recognition of French military protection. The French Navy Minister Chasseloup-Laubat however, opposed to the return of Cochinchinese territory, threatened Napoleon III with his resignation and that of the whole cabinet, forcing him to order the cancellation of the agreement in June 1864

Through his visit to France, Phan Thanh Giản obtained a first hand understanding of the level of advancement of France compared to Vietnam, was astonished at examples of technological innovation such as steam trains, and stated on his return to Vietnam that France's "wealth and strength are beyond description". Tự Đức only responded to this warning with admonitions of moral rectitude:

Governorship 
Upon his return, Tự Đức nominated Phan Thanh Giản governor of the remaining southern provinces. When France invaded the rest of the southern territories in 1867, Phan Thanh Giản chose to avoid armed resistance and failed to defend the citadel of Vĩnh Long, waiting for orders that never came, resigned from his position and took his own life through poisoning.

Family

Phan's family was of Sino–Vietnamese descent. His grandfather, Phan Thanh Tap was a native of Haicheng (near modern-day Longhai, Fujian) in Zhangzhou prefecture of Fujian province before later ultimately migrating to Vietnam due to political sentiments against the ruling Qing government. Phan Thanh Tap migrated to Vietnam in the early 18th century, along with his family and relatives and settled in the village of Hoi Trung at Bình Định Province. Upon settling in Vietnam, he married a Vietnamese woman, Huynh Thi Ngoc, with whom his Phan's father, Thanh Ngạn was born from this union. Phan Thanh Ngạn began his career as a clerk to the Nguyễn court. In 1798, Phan Thanh Ngạn was appointed as the chief supplier for Lord Ánh's (Emperor Gia Long from 1802) navy and was sent on a diplomatic mission to Tourane, but was later shipwrecked at lost at sea.

Phan's mother was also of Chinese descent; her great-great grandfather migrated to Vietnam from Fujian province during mid 17th century. He had three sons, Phan Hương, Phan Liêm (also known as Phan Thanh Liêm, or Phan Thanh Tòng), and Phan Tôn, of which the last two organised an armed rebellion against the French soldiers who had colonised Vĩnh Long and were later defeated. Phan Hương stayed in Vĩnh Long, lived hidden as a farmer. Phan Liêm and Phan Tôn escaped to Huế, then followed Nguyễn Tri Phương in Battle of Hanoi (1873). They were defeated and captured by the French force in this one-day battle. General Phương was heavily wounded but refused to be treated by French and began a hunger strike, dying shortly afterwards. Meanwhile, Phan Liêm and Phan Tôn were sent to France.

In popular culture
Nowadays, Phan Thanh Giản is being venerated as a minor god among his family members and a few in southern Vietnam.

Images

See also 

 France–Vietnam relations

Notes

References 

 Choi, Byung Wook, Southern Vietnam Under the Reign of Minh Mạng (1820–1841): Central Policies and Local Response, SEAP Publications, 2004, 

 Nguyẽn, Phút Tán, A Modern History of Viet-nam (1802–1954), Nhà sách Khai-Trí, 1964

 

1796 births
1867 deaths
Suicides in Vietnam
People of the Cochinchina campaign
Nguyen dynasty officials
Vietnamese Confucianists
Minh Hương
19th-century Vietnamese philosophers
19th-century Vietnamese calligraphers